Chenar Bon (also Romanized as Chenār Bon) is a village in Machian Rural District, Kelachay District, Rudsar County, Gilan Province, Iran. At the 2006 census, its population was 149, in 49 families.

References 

Populated places in Rudsar County